China Blue is a 2005 documentary film directed by Micha Peled. It follows the life of Jasmine Li, a young seventeen-year-old worker from Sichuan province, in a Chinese jeans factory, Lifeng Clothes Factory (丽锋服饰制衣有限公司) in Shaxi, Guangdong producing Vigaze Jeans (a company based in Istanbul, Turkey), hence the title. Jasmine earned about half a yuan for one hour's work (which amounted to about six US cents).

The documentary discusses both the sweatshop conditions in factories in China and the growing importance of China as an exporting country on a global scale. It's part of Teddy Bear Films' Globalization Trilogy together with Store Wars: When Wal-Mart Comes to Town, that focuses on consumerism in the U.S., and Bitter Seeds, that looks at the raw materials – the crisis of the farmers in India who are growing the cotton exported to China's garment factories to be used for the clothes sold in the West.

At the 2005 Amnesty International film festival, it won the Amnesty International-DOEN Award. In April 2007 China Blue aired on the award-winning PBS series Independent Lens.

References

External links
Official website for China Blue
China Blue webpage for Independent Lens on PBS 
Audio interview of filmmaker Micha Peled with C.S. Soong, host of Against the Grain on KPFA (Pacifica Radio), August 7, 2007

American documentary films
Documentary films about globalization
Documentary films about business
Documentary films about China
2005 films
2005 documentary films
2000s American films